Alessandro Ripellino (born 1957, Rome, Italy) is an Italian-born architect who has been working in Sweden since 1982. He is a Swedish-qualified architect SAR / MSA and a fully qualified and licensed Italian architect too (University of Rome Faculty of Architecture).

Ripellino has won numerous awards for his work including Stockholm City Council’s building of the year award (Årets Stockholmsbyggnad), the annual architectural award of the Swedish Concrete Federation (Svensk Betongs arkitekturpris) and an award for outstanding Swedish design (Utmärkt Svensk Form) from the Swedish Society of Crafts and Design which promotes Swedish design within Sweden and abroad.

Ripellino graduated from the Faculty of Architecture of the University of Rome and since 1992 has co-owned and co-led the company Rosenbergs Arkitekter with fellow architect Inga Varg. His work ranges from complex urban planning and civic building projects to interior design projects to light and neon design.

Ripellino is the son of Italian author Angelo Maria Ripellino and Czech Ela Hlochóva. He speaks five languages: Swedish, Italian, English, French and Czech.

Biography
Whilst studying at the University of Rome (Università di Roma La Sapienza) Ripellino won a scholarship to Sweden’s KTH Royal Institute of Technology (Kungliga Tekniska Högskolan) hosted by Professor Bengt Hidemark. After studying in Rome under professors M.L. Anversa and L. Thermes Ripellino graduated in architecture and technology and returned to Sweden to begin working with Swedish architect Lennart Bergström. After three years with Bergström, Ripellino began working at Rosenberg & Stål Arkitektkontor where he became a part-owner with Inga Varg.

Today the company is named Rosenbergs Arkitketer. During his time at the firm Ripellino has been responsible for, amongst other work, building projects like the Lindhagsskrapan high-rise in the Kvarteret Lusten district of Stockholm, the high-rise Rica Talk Hotel next to Stockholmsmässan exhibition halls, Bankhus 90 - office buildings of the leading Nordic bank SEB (Skandinaviska Enskilda Banken AB), major urban development projects like Västra City and Täby Parkstad, as well as interior design projects like Hotel Birger Jarl.

Ripellino is also known for his work on lighting design, and design of lighting fixtures and furnitures. Since 1998 he has worked with the ongoing creative architectural development of the large exhibition complex Stockholmsmässan. In 2009 Ripellino developed proposals for Stockholmsfyren, the tallest residential high-rise in Stockholm. He has been a member of the jury in numerous architecture competitions and is a much sought-after lecturer in architecture and city planning.

Awards
2012: Nominated for Lindhagsskrapan building in Stockholm City Council’s building of the year award (Årets Stockholmsbyggnad)
2012: Nominated for Lindhagsskrapan building in the Swedish Concrete Federation’s annual architecture award (Svensk Betongs arkitekturpris)
2012: Winner of the International Galvanizing Awards for the AE-Hallen section of the exhibition complex Stockholmsmässan
2008: Winner of the architecture award of the Federation of Swedish Glazing Contractors (Glasbranschförengingen glaspris) for the Rica Talk Hotel
2006: Winner of the Stockholm Region Heritage Federation’s architecture award (Stockholm läns hembygdsförbund) for Rica Talk Hotel
2006: Winner of the Swedish, West Sweden and South Sweden prize for best lighting from Swedish lighting association Svenska Belysningssällskapet, who promote knowledge, creativity and wider appreciation in the field of lighting. Prize awarded for Rica Talk Hotel.
1993: Light fixture Stockholmspendel wins outstanding Swedish design award (Utmärkt Svensk Form) from the Swedish Society of Crafts and Design which promotes Swedish design within Sweden and abroad
1992: Winner of the architecture award of the Betongelementföreningen for the SEB office building Bankhus 90 in Rissne

A selection of work
Lindhagsskrapan
Rica Talk Hotel
SEB office building Bankhus 90, in Rissne
Västra city
Täby Parkstad
Stockholmsmässan exhibition center, Älvsjö
Ericsson micro-electronics factory in Kista 
Hotel Birger Jarl

See also
Rosenbergs Arkitekter

References

Further reading
Arkitektur 2-2012, Lindhagsskrapan
Rum 9-2012, Stockholmsfyren
Arkitektur 7-2006, Rica Talk Hotel
Arkitektur 8-2002, 3xRosenbergs Arkitekter
Arkitektur 5-1996, Ericsson Submicron fabrik i Kista
Arkitektur 7-1992, SEB, Bankhus 90

External links
http://rosenbergs.se

1957 births
Living people
Architects from Rome
Swedish architects